Sandviken Hospital is a psychiatric hospital situated in the Sandviken neighborhood of Bergen, Norway. It is part of Bergen Hospital Trust. The hospital was established in 1891 as Neevengården Hospital. It took the current name in 1978. It is the only secure psychiatric unit within Western Norway Regional Health Authority.

References

Psychiatric hospitals in Norway
Buildings and structures in Bergen
Hospitals established in 1891
1891 establishments in Norway